= Colney Butts =

Former name of an area in Hertfordshire, England

Coordinates: 51°39′N 0°24′W

Colney Butts is the former name of an area of Watford, Hertfordshire, England, around Vicarage Road and the cemetery.
